Spreenhagen (Lower Sorbian: Sprjewiny Ług) is a municipality in the Oder-Spree district, in Brandenburg, Germany.

Demography

Local council
The local council of Spreenhagen has 16 members. Elections were held on May 25, 2014 with the following results:
SPD                      = 35.8% (6 seats)
GfB (Free Citizens)      = 28.9% (5 seats)
DCM (Club Markgrafpieske)= 13.0% (2 seats)
LINKE                    = 9.2%  (1 seat)
CDU                      = 7.5%  (1 seat)
NPD                      = 5.6%  (1 seat)

Notable residents
 Marienetta Jirkowsky (1962–1980), one of at least 139 victims at the Berlin Wall; also one of only eight female victims, and the youngest of those eight female victims.

References

Localities in Oder-Spree